Herbert Blake (26 August 1894 – 1958) was a professional footballer who played for Bristol City, Tottenham Hotspur and Kettering Town.

Football career 
Blake began his career at the non-League club Fishponds before joining Bristol City in 1914 where he played a solitary match. In 1919 the goalkeeper had a trial at Preston North End. Blake moved on to Welsh Southern League club Mid-Rhondda before joining Tottenham Hotspur where he went on to appear in 56 matches in all competitions between 1921–23. He ended his career at Kettering Town.

References

1894 births
1958 deaths
English footballers
Association football goalkeepers
English Football League players
Bristol City F.C. players
Tottenham Hotspur F.C. players
Kettering Town F.C. players
Mid Rhondda F.C. players
Footballers from Bristol